Marine City (마린시티, marinsiti) is a residential area in Haeundae District, Busan, South Korea. Most of the buildings are very luxurious skyscrapers. Marine City is built on reclaimed land between the popular areas of Haeundae Beach and Centum City. The tallest residential complexes in Marine City include Haeundae Doosan We've the Zenith, Haeundae I'Park Marina, Daewoo Aratrium Haeundae and Park Hyatt Busan.

Geography of Busan